Yesit Martínez (born 31 January 2002), is a Bolivian professional footballer who plays as a winger for Independiente Petrolero.

References

External links

2002 births
Living people
Bolivian footballers
Bolivia international footballers
Association football forwards
Bolivian Primera División players